Ópera do Malandro, from 1979, is a Brazilian musical play, written by Chico Buarque and directed by Luiz Antônio Martinez Corrêa.

The play is inspired by the classic Beggar's Opera of John Gay and the Threepenny Opera, of Bertolt Brecht and Kurt Weill. It is also a posthumous tribute to Paulo Pontes (1940–1976) (pt).

Synopsis and analysis 
The Ópera do Malandro reveals past features of Brazilian culture that still persist.

A pimp called Duran disguises himself as a successful salesman. Vitória was a madam who also lived by selling her own body. Her daughter, Teresinha, had fallen in love with an upper-class citizen, Max Overseas, a man that lived off corruption in complicity with the chief Police officer, Chaves. The other characters are prostitutes, presented as saleswomen in a clothes store, and the promiscuous transvestite Geni, who was frequently attacked with rocks; people used to say she was "useful" because of this.

The play's action takes place in the 1940s; its theme: gambling prohibition, prostitution and smuggling. Then it shows a context similar to the third millennium, with piracy and other black-market activities.

Max Overseas really works in international businesses, even on the threshold of legality, in collusion with a pimp and the chief Police officer.

All of the songs are composed by Chico, who, due to his brightness, manages to make them in harmony with the text. The song Geni e o Zepelim (the overture), tells about a transvestite whose only gift or skill is to be a "whipping-post" for the neighborhood. This fact, that is only revealed to spectators of the show, means that she has no value.

Nevertheless, when the captain of a bright zeppelin intends to bombard the city, accepting to change his mind only if he had a one night stand with the transvestite, all the citizens ask her to consent to the captain's desires.

The songs follow the pattern of rhymed and metrical verses, according to the intellectual tradition of the author's family.

Technical staff (first performance) 
The official source gives the following information:

Crew:
 General director: Luiz Antônio Martinez Corrêa
 Assistant to the general director: João Carlos Motta
 Scenography: Maurício Sette
 Scenography assistant: Rita Murtinho
 Musical director: John Neschling
 Assistant to the musical director: Paulo Sauer
 Arrangement: John Neschling, Paulo Sauer
 Interpretative vocal director: Glorinha Beutenmuller
 Corporal director: Fernando Pinto
 Lighting: Jorge Carvalho
 Script: Maurício Arraes

Cast - in order of appearance:

 The producer: Ary Fontoura
 The matriarch: Maria Alice Vergueiro
 João Alegre: Nadinho Da Ilha
 Duran: Ary Fontoura
 Vitória: Maria Alice Vergueiro
 Teresinha: Marieta Severo
 Max: Otávio Augusto
 Lúcia: Elba Ramalho
 Geni: Emiliano Queirós
 Barrabás: Ivens Godinho
 Johnny Walker: Vander De Castro
 Phillip Morris: Paschoal Villamboim
 Big Bem: Ivan De Almeida
 : Vicente Barcelos
 Dóris Pelanca: Ilva Nino
 Fichinha: Cidinha Milan
 Dorinha Tubão: Elza De Andrade
 Shirley Paquete: Neuza Borges
 Jussara Pé De Anjo: Maria Alves
 Mimi Bibelô: Cláudia Jimenez

Track list 
Songs used in the play are:

  (Mack the Knife) (B.Brecht, K.Weill)
  (Chico Buarque)
  (Chico Buarque)
  (Chico Buarque)
  (Chico Buarque)
  (Chico Buarque)
  (Chico Buarque)
  (Chico Buarque)
  (Chico Buarque)
  (Chico Buarque)
  (Chico Buarque)
  (Chico Buarque)
  (Chico Buarque)
  (Chico Buarque)
  (Chico Buarque)
  (Adpt. e texto de Chico Buarque sobre trechos de "Rigoletto" de Verdi, "Carmen" de Bizet, "Aida" de Verdi, "La Traviata" de Verdi e Taunhauser de Wagner)
  (Mack the Knife) (Chico Buarque)

Reception 
Most critics were positive, complimenting the veracity of its portrayal of the hypocritical Brazilian society of the 40-70's.

See also 
 Ópera do Malandro (movie) 
 Ópera do Malandro (opera soundtrack) 
 Chico Buarque

References

External links 
 Official Chico Buarque's Site
 

Brazilian plays
1978 in theatre